The Buru racket-tail (Prioniturus mada), is a species of parrot in the family Psittaculidae. It is endemic to forest on the island of Buru, one of the Maluku Islands of Indonesia.

Description
The beak is blackish and lighter at the base, and the long undertail-coverts are yellow. The adult male has blue upper-parts from the back of its head to mid-back and which extends into the upper surfaces of the forewings. The female has a small area of blue on the nape. Juveniles do not have racket-shaped tail feathers. The male juvenile has a little blue on the nape and the female juvenile has all-green upper-parts.

Range and Distribution 
The Buru racket-tail is endemic to the Indonesian island of Buru in the Maluku Islands archipelago. There have been no other sightings of wild Prioniturus mada outside the island of Buru.

Habitat 
Prioniturus mada is usually found in elevations up to approximately 1600 meters where it is found in many different types of forest habitat. It is commonly seen in both old-growth forest and taller secondary forest. It is also usually found in the remaining trees of cultivated areas such as in farms and small villages.

Ecology 
The Buru racket-tail is usually found in flocks of up to 10 birds. They are seasonally nomadic birds that travel to where fruiting trees are blooming in the mountains. The diet of Prioniturus mada mainly consists of wild fruits, seeds, berries, and flowers. Females usually lay a clutch of up to five eggs. The known breeding season for the Buru racket-tail is from December–February.

Threats 
Like most other Indonesian birds, the Buru racket-tail is threatened by habitat destruction due to deforestation to make ways for plantations (especially palm oil), logging, and mining operations. This bird is also threatened by trapping for the exotic pet trade.

References

Cited texts

External links
Oriental Bird Images: Buru Racquet-tail  Selected photos
https://www.parrots.org/encyclopedia/buru-racquet-tailed-parrot

Buru racket-tail
Birds of Buru
Buru racket-tail
Taxonomy articles created by Polbot